Sistani Mahalleh (also Romanized as Sīstānī Maḩalleh; also known as Sīstān Maḩalleh) is a village in Anjirabad Rural District, in the Central District of Gorgan County, Golestan Province, Iran. At the 2006 census, its population was 902, in 201 families.

References 

Populated places in Gorgan County